Mashooq Ali Khan also known as Jam Mashooq Ali Khan was a Pakistani politician, federal minister and an advisor to prime minister Nawaz Sharif. 

He also was the adviser on the Indus River System Authority (IRSA) Affairs with the status of a Federal Minister in the cabinet of prime minister Shahid Khaqan Abbasi.

Personal life 
He was the eldest son of ex chief minister (Sindh) Jam Sadiq Ali.

Political career 
In 1988, Jam Mashooq was elected to PS-67 for 8th provincial assembly of Sindh.  He became a member of National Assembly of Pakistan (MNA) for NA-181 (Sanghar-II) in 1990, 1993 and 1997 elections.

References

Pakistani politicians
2018 deaths
Sindh MPAs 1988–1990
Pakistani MNAs 1990–1993
Pakistani MNAs 1993–1996
Year of birth missing